Palou is a Catalan surname. Notable people with the surname include:

Álex Palou (born 1997), Spanish racing driver
Anthony Palou (born 1965), French writer
Berenguier de Palou (fl. 1160–1209), Catalan troubadour from Palol in the County of Roussillon
Berenguer de Palou II (died 1241), Bishop of Barcelona from 1212 to 1241
Francesc Palóu (1723–1789), Spanish Franciscan missionary, administrator and historian
Jaime Serra Palou (born 1964), Catalan artist and journalist
Jaume Matas Palou (born 1956), Spanish politician
Matilde Palou, Mexican film actress
Maria del Mar Bonnin Palou (born 1990), Spanish racing cyclist
Robert Pérez Palou (born 1948), Spanish portrait painter

See also 
Oakdale/Palou station, is a light rail stop on the Muni Metro T Third Street line in the Bayview neighborhood of San Francisco, California

Catalan-language surnames